Rémy Montagne (9 January 1917 – 10 January 1991) was a French lawyer, politician and media proprietor. He was a member of the National Assembly from 1958 to 1980.

Early life
Rémy Montagne was born on 9 January 1917 in Mirabeau. He was a member of the Association catholique de la jeunesse française as a young man. He was an avid reader of Jacques Maritain and became friends with Maurice Blondel, two Catholic philosophers.

During World War II, he was openly opposed to the Nazis. In 1940, at a meeting of young Catholics in Aix-en-Provence, he expressed his intention to fight back against the German invaders, adding that the real battle consisted in resisting against the totalitarianism of the Hitlerian ideology. Six months later, he lost an eye in battle, and his brother Martial was deported to the Dora concentration camp, where he was murdered by the Nazis.

Career
Montagne started his career as a lawyer shortly after the war, in 1945. He founded L’Eure-Éclair, a weekly newspaper, in 1954.

He served as the Union for French Democracy  member of the National Assembly for the 3rd district of Eure from 1958 to 1980. He was then appointed Secretary of State to the Ministry of Health and Social Affairs, where he served for nine months between 1980 and 1981.

In 1985, he founded Ampère, a publishing house. It changed its name to Média-Participations in 1989.

Personal life
He married Geneviève Michelin, the sister of automobile heir François Michelin, on 3 May 1945. They had seven children.

Death
He died in 1991. His biography, authored by Marie-Joëlle Guillaume, was published in 2010.

References

1917 births
1991 deaths
People from Vaucluse
French Roman Catholics
Politicians from Provence-Alpes-Côte d'Azur
Centre of Social Democrats politicians
Union for French Democracy politicians
Deputies of the 1st National Assembly of the French Fifth Republic
Deputies of the 2nd National Assembly of the French Fifth Republic
Deputies of the 3rd National Assembly of the French Fifth Republic
Deputies of the 5th National Assembly of the French Fifth Republic
Deputies of the 6th National Assembly of the French Fifth Republic